Capnochroa is a genus of comb-clawed beetles in the family Tenebrionidae. There are at least two described species in Capnochroa.

Species
These two species belong to the genus Capnochroa:
 Capnochroa fuliginosa (Melsheimer) (comb-clawed beetle)
 Capnochroa senilis Wickham, 1913

References

Further reading

 

Alleculinae
Articles created by Qbugbot